Shelford is a rural locality in Victoria, Australia.

Shelford is nestled in a valley divided by the Leigh River, Golf Hill Station was established in 1836 on the river banks. Most of the local squatters came from Scotland so the town had a strong Presbyterian feel and had two churches. The Post Office opened on 1 July 1847 with the town names The Leigh which was renamed Shelford in 1854. By 1865 the town had a court house, post office, a mechanics institute and two hotels.
In 1874 the Shelford Bridge was constructed using iron imported from Liverpool.

The town was never large; in the 1930s the town had a population of 130 persons.
After the Second world war, the larger land holding were carved up for a soldier settlement scheme. Sixty-nine farms covering 45,000 acres were sold off to returning servicemen and their families. 

In 1994 the Post Office became a Licensed Post Office, and has since closed; the date of closure is unknown.

Heritage listed sites
Shelford contains a number of heritage listed sites, including:

 1372 Rokewood-Shelford Road, Leigh Shire Hall and Toll House
 Shelford-Bannockburn Road, Leigh River Iron Bridge

Shelford Today
Shelford today still has a Recreation Reserve where the Shelford Cricket Club play their home games and the Recreation Reserve has tennis courts and a basketball court as well.  Shelford also has a Primary School and a Town Hall.

References

Towns in Victoria (Australia)
Golden Plains Shire